Nothin' but the Blues is a 1984 (see 1984 in music) album by the American jazz and blues singer Joe Williams with Red Holloway & His Blues All-Stars.  For his work on the album, Williams was awarded the 1985 Grammy for Best Jazz Vocal Performance.

Track listing
 "Who She Do" (Joe Williams) 5:15
 "Just a Dream" (Big Bill Broonzy, Jimmy Clanton) 4:44
 "Hold It Right There" (Clark Terry, William Grey, Eddie "Cleanhead" Vinson) 2:42
 "Please Send Me Someone to Love" (Percy Mayfield) 5:11
 "Going to Chicago Blues" (Jimmy Rushing, Count Basie) 4:48
 "Ray Brown's in Town" (Red Holloway) 3:51
 "In the Evening"/"Rocks in My Bed" (Leroy Carr)/(Duke Ellington) 6:55
 "Alright, OK, You Win" (Mayme Watts, Sidney Wyche)  4:41
 "Mean Old World"/"Wee Baby Blues" (Al Frazier, T-Bone Walker)/(Big Joe Turner, Pete Johnson) 7:34
 "The Comeback" (Charles Frazier) 5:03
 "Tell Me Where to Scratch" (Williams) 5:04
 "Sent For You Yesterday" (Basie, Rushing, Eddie Durham) 3:29

Personnel 
Recorded November 16 & 17, 1983, in Hollywood, Los Angeles, California, United States:

 Joe Williams - vocals
 Red Holloway - leader, tenor sax
 Eddie "Cleanhead" Vinson - vocal (#3 only) & alto sax
 Jack McDuff - organ & piano
 Phil Upchurch - guitar
 Ray Brown - bass
 Gerryck King - drums

External links
[ Allmusic: Nothin' but the Blues]

1984 albums
Joe Williams (jazz singer) albums
Grammy Award for Best Jazz Vocal Album
Vocal jazz albums